Tamir Airways was a Israeli regional airline based in Tel Aviv.

Destinations
The airline operated domestic scheduled and air taxi flights from Sde Dov Airport, Tel Aviv to Rosh Pina Airport as well as owning the rights to fly to the defunct Kiryat Shmona Airport.
Tamir Airways also operated private international charter services from Sde Dov Airport and Ben Gurion International Airport in Tel Aviv to Europe and Mediterranean area. On May 17, 2007, the airline announced that it would be stopping its scheduled domestic services due to a dispute with the Transport Ministry.

Fleet
The Tamir Airways fleet consisted of the following aircraft (as of April 2008):

References

Defunct airlines of Israel
Airlines established in 2004
Airlines disestablished in 2007